The Pittsburgh Cultural Trust (PCT) is a nonprofit arts organization formed in 1984 to promote economic and cultural development in Downtown Pittsburgh. The "Trust" has focused its work on a 14-square block section called the Cultural District, which comprises numerous entertainment and cultural venues, restaurants, and residential buildings. All together, the organization claims to oversee more than one million square feet of real estate, including commercial and residential buildings, making it one of the largest landowners downtown. In recent years the organization has had a contentious relationship with the city of Pittsburgh concerning the tax status for many of its properties, resulting in a case being heard by the state Supreme Court in 2011.

As of February 2018, the PCT's president and CEO is J. Kevin McMahon. According to its 2016 "Report to the Community", PCT's net assets were valued at $120 million.

History
The Pittsburgh Cultural Trust was founded in 1984 by H. J. Heinz II with the principal aim of restoring downtown Pittsburgh as a vibrant cultural destination. Heinz and others, including William Rea and his son, U.S. Senator John Heinz, began with Pittsburgh's first renovated former movie palace,  Heinz Hall, (which was built as the former Loew's Penn Theater).

The PCT's first major project was the restoration of the former Stanley Theater. The Stanley Theater was originally designed by the firm of Hoffman & Henon and opened on February 27, 1928.  Under the PCT's management, this theater underwent a $43 million restoration and reopened in 1987 as the 2,800-seat Benedum Center for the Performing Arts.  That year, the PCT and its partners presented an annual Broadway series in the Cultural District.

The Byham Theater was another theater venue restoration project. Built in 1903 as the Gayety Theater, it included a stage and Vaudeville house, and featured stars such as Ethel Barrymore, Gertrude Lawrence, and Helen Hayes. It was renamed The Fulton in the 1930s when it became a full-time movie theater. In 1990, the PCT bought and refurbished the theater. The Byham family of Pittsburgh made a major naming gift for a 1995 renovation, and it has been the Byham Theater since.

In 1992, PCT opened Wood Street Galleries, its first visual arts project. PCT purchased and refurbished a former XXX movie theater in 1995, and re-opened the 194-seat theater as the Harris Theater, which screens independent, foreign, and classic films.

In 1999, the PCT's 650-seat O'Reilly Theater opened as the permanent home of the Pittsburgh Public Theater. The same year, the  Agnes R. Katz Plaza was unveiled. The theater features a  bronze fountain designed by sculptor Louise Bourgeois and the work of landscape architect Dan Kiley. Also during 1999, artists Robert Wilson and Richard Gluckman were selected by the PCT to create a series of public art projects in the Cultural District.

In 2000, PCT established Shared Services, a consortium including the Pittsburgh Ballet Theatre, Pittsburgh Civic Light Opera, Pittsburgh Public Theater, Pittsburgh Opera, Pittsburgh Symphony Orchestra, and August Wilson Center for African American Culture.

Jack Heinz chose PCT's first President and CEO, Carol Brown. She managed the organization from 1986 until 2000. In 2001, J. Kevin McMahon was named President and CEO.

In 2002, Pittsburgh Dance Council became a programming division of PCT.  PCT opened Theater Square in 2003, a  complex including the 265-seat Cabaret at Theater Square, a parking garage, centralized box office, restaurant, and bar, and the Carolyn M. Byham WQED 89.3 FM remote broadcast studio. That same year, First Night Pittsburgh became a program of the PCT.

PCT presented the Quebec Festival and the inaugural Pittsburgh Festival of Firsts in 2004. It also turned an adult bookstore at 812 Liberty Avenue into SPACE, a gallery showcasing regional artists’ work, and purchased 937 Liberty Avenue to be utilized by local arts organizations as an office space and as a flexible performing and visual arts venue. 2004 was also the first year the PCT organized a quarterly Gallery Crawl in the Cultural District, a free arts open house.

In 2005, the PCT purchased the property that would become home to the James E. Rohr Building, the Trust Arts Education Center.  The PCT presented the Australia Festival in 2007.  The Pittsburgh International Children's Theater and Festival became a programming division of the PCT in 2008. During that same year, the PCT presented the 2nd Pittsburgh International Festival of Firsts. In 2009, Three Rivers Arts Festival became a programming division of the PCT.  As of 2010, the PCT's total revenue was publicly listed as $46 million.

On April 18, 2012, the Executive Committee accepted Kenneth Milani’s resignation from the position of Chairman of the PCT's Board of Trustees.  Veronica Corpuz, spokesperson for PCT at that time, informed the media that the Executive Committee had appointed attorneys Carolyn Duronio and Chuck Queenan as Milani's interim replacement until a new chairman was found. The current chairman is Richard J. Harshman.

Programming

Visual arts

Exhibitions held in the PCT's Wood Street Galleries feature new media artists from around the world. SPACE and 707 Penn promote local artists.

Recent Wood Street Galleries exhibitions featured work by artists Bill Vorn and Louis-Philippe Demers (2014); Alexandre Burton and Edwin van der Heide (2014); Erwin Redl (2014); Kurt Hentschläger (2013); Chang-Jin Lee (2013); and Ryoji Ikeda (2013).

Public art

The PCT has seven public art projects on display year-round in Pittsburgh's Cultural District. They include the following:

Allegheny Riverfront Park located at the Allegheny riverfront, Rachel Carson Bridge to Fort Duquesne Bridge. The park was commissioned in the early 1990s when the PCT's District Plan included the creation of a riverfront park to border the northern boundary of the Cultural District, Pittsburgh. The PCT's then Public Arts Advisory Committee commissioned a first-time collaboration between artist Ann Hamilton and landscape architect Michael Van Valkenburgh to create the park.
 Agnes R. Katz Plaza located at 7th Avenue & Penn Avenue. Kata Plaza, commissioned in 1998, features Louise Bourgeois sculptures, including three granite benches shaped like eyeballs and the centerpiece 25-foot-tall bronze fountain. Landscape architect Dan Kiley and architect Michael Graves also worked on the project.
 Cell Phone Disco located at Tito Way & Exchange Way. The artist collective, Informationlab (Auke Touwslager, Ursula Lavrenčič) were commissioned in 2010 to create this outdoor Art & Science interactive installation.
 Haas Mural located on the Fort Duquesne Boulevard façade of the Byham Theater, 101 6th Street. The 36-by-56-foot mural was commissioned in 1993 and painted by Richard Haas in the trompe-l'œil style.
 Magnolias for Pittsburgh located at 7th Avenue & Penn Avenue. The Public Art Network of Americans for the Arts selected Tony Tasset's "Magnolias for Pittsburgh" to be in the 2007 "Year in Review". The installation features two bronze magnolia trees, five live magnolia trees, and a landscape design.
 Momento Mori located at Tito Way & Exchange Way.
 Sign of Light located at Penn Avenue Place, Stanwix Street & Fort Duquesne Boulevard, facing the Allegheny River. This 20-by-40-foot electronic sign is composed of LEDs that project a white triangle floating on a blue-gray background. "Sign of Light" is visible from the North Side (Pittsburgh) and PNC Park.

In 2013, the PCT invited Dutch artist Florentijn Hofman to bring his Rubber Duck sculpture to Pittsburgh. It sold rubber duck-sized versions of Rubber Duck for $10, with proceeds going to the trust.

Notes

References

External links
 Official website
 Pittsburgh Cultural Trust Records (Pittsburgh Cultural Trust Records, 1926–2000, CTC.2000.02, Curtis Theatre Collection, Special Collections Department, University of Pittsburgh)

Organizations based in Pittsburgh
Culture of Pittsburgh
Art in Pittsburgh